Asylbek Zheenbekov (Asylbek Sharipovich (Sharip uulu) Zheenbekov) (born 27 August 1963 in Biy-Myrza village) is a Kyrgyzstani politician. He was elected the Speaker of the 5th and 6th Supreme Council of Kyrgyzstan in 2006 and 2011, respectively. His brother, Sooronbay Jeenbekov, is a former Kyrgyz President and Prime Minister.

References

Living people
1963 births
Chairmen of the Supreme Council (Kyrgyzstan)
People from Osh Region
Social Democratic Party of Kyrgyzstan politicians